William Edward Dowdeswell (13 June 1841 – 12 July 1893) was an English Conservative politician who sat in the House of Commons between 1865 and 1876.

Dowdeswell was the son of William Dowdeswell of Pull Court and his wife Amelia Letitia Graham daughter of Robert Graham of Cossington Hall, Somerset. His father was MP for Tewkesbury from 1835 to 1842. He was educated at Westminster School and at Christ Church, Oxford. He was a J.P. for Worcestershire, and captain of Worcestershire Yeomanry Cavalry.
 
At the 1865 general election Dowdeswell was elected Member of Parliament for Tewkesbury which he held until March 1866. In 1866 he was elected MP for West Worcestershire and held the seat until 1876.

Personal life and death
Dowdeswell married Emily Parkyns, daughter of Sir Thomas Parkyns, 6th Baronet in February 1869. Dowdeswell died on 12 July 1893; he was 52 years old.

References

External links
 

1841 births
1893 deaths
Conservative Party (UK) MPs for English constituencies
UK MPs 1865–1868
UK MPs 1868–1874
UK MPs 1874–1880
People educated at Westminster School, London
Alumni of Christ Church, Oxford
Worcestershire Yeomanry officers
People from Malvern Hills District